This Old House is an American home improvement media franchise, including a television program, spinoff programs, and a magazine. 

This Old House may also refer to:

"This Old House" (Roseanne), a 1992 television episode
"This Ole House", a 1954 song by Stuart Hamblen; covered by Rosemary Clooney (1954) and Shakin' Stevens (1980)
This Ole House (album), by Shakin' Stevens, 1980
"This Old House", a 2004 song by Loretta Lynn from Van Lear Rose
"This Old House", a 1987 song by S-K-B